Deh Chenar (also Romanized as Deh Chenār) is a village in Mohammadabad Rural District, in the Central District of Zarand County, Kerman Province, Iran. At the 2006 census, its population was 976, in 231 families.

References 

Populated places in Zarand County